Sivrice District is a district of Elazığ Province of Turkey. Its seat is the town Sivrice. Its area is 710 km2, and its population is 7,703 (2021).

Composition
There is 1 municipality in Sivrice District:
Sivrice

There are 50 villages in Sivrice District:

 Akbuğday
 Akseki
 Alaattinköy
 Alıncık
 Aşağıçanakçı
 Başkaynak
 Bekçitepe
 Canuşağı
 Çatakkaya
 Çevrimtaş
 Çortunlu
 Dedeyolu
 Dereboynu
 Dikmen
 Doğanbağı
 Dörtbölük
 Duygulu
 Elmasuyu
 Gelindere
 Görgülü
 Gözeli
 Günay
 Günbalı
 Hacılar
 Haftasar
 Ilıncak
 Kalaba
 Kamışlık
 Kavakköy
 Kavallı
 Kayabağları
 Kayapınar
 Kılıçkaya
 Kösebayır
 Kürkköy
 Mollaali
 Nergize
 Soğukpınar
 Sürek
 Tarlatepe
 Taşlıyayla
 Topaluşağı
 Uslu
 Üçlerce
 Üğrük
 Yaruşağı
 Yedikardeş
 Yedipınar
 Yukarıçanakçı
 Yürekkaya

References

Districts of Elazığ Province